The Very Best of Meat Loaf is a 1998 album spanning the first 21 years of Meat Loaf's recording career. Although not reaching the top ten in the United Kingdom, it was certified double platinum there in 2013. The album features many of Meat Loaf's best-known songs as well as a few from his lesser known albums of the 1980s.

Besides hits like "Paradise by the Dashboard Light" and "I'd Do Anything for Love (But I Won't Do That)", The Very Best of Meat Loaf contains three new tracks. Two of those are written by Andrew Lloyd Webber and Jim Steinman and are adapted from their musical Whistle Down the Wind; both of these tracks were produced by Steinman. The third new track, "Is Nothing Sacred" is written by Steinman and lyricist Don Black, and produced by Russ Titelman (the single version of this song is a duet with Patti Russo, whereas the album version is a solo song by Meat Loaf. The single version would later appear on the VH1 Storytellers CD).

Both Bat Out of Hell and Bat Out of Hell II: Back into Hell are prominently featured with five tracks from the first and four from the second. The album did not feature any songs from his 1986 album Blind Before I Stop.

The album was re-released in 2003 with the same tracks in a different order, and did so again in 2011 with the original order but now under the title The Essential Meat Loaf. Following an appearance on VH1 Storytellers in 1999 (which was released as an album and a DVD), Meat Loaf's next studio album was the 2003 album, Couldn't Have Said It Better.

Track listing

Original 1998 release

Disc 1

Disc 2

2003 re-release
Disc one
"Bat Out of Hell"
"Dead Ringer for Love"
"Two Out of Three Ain't Bad"
"Rock and Roll Dreams Come Through"
"I'd Lie for You (And That's the Truth)"
"Modern Girl"
"Midnight at the Lost and Found"
"Objects in the Rear View Mirror May Appear Closer Than They Are"
"Life Is a Lemon and I Want My Money Back" (remix)

Disc two
"I'd Do Anything for Love (But I Won't Do That)"
"You Took the Words Right Out of My Mouth (Hot Summer Night)"
"Heaven Can Wait"
"Not a Dry Eye in the House"
"Paradise by the Dashboard Light"
"A Kiss Is a Terrible Thing to Waste"
"Is Nothing Sacred"
"Home by Now/No Matter What"
"Nocturnal Pleasure"

Charts

References

Meat Loaf albums
1998 compilation albums
Albums with cover art by Michael Whelan
Virgin Records compilation albums
Sony Music compilation albums